Hylda may refer to:

Hylda Baker (1905–1986), British comedian, actress and music hall star
Hylda Queally (born 1961), Irish-born American talent agent in the Hollywood film industry

See also
Hilda (disambiguation)